Estelle Elizabeth (born 29 June 1996) is a French ice dancer. She and former partner Romain Le Gac represented France at the 2012 Winter Youth Olympics and at two World Junior Championships, achieving their best result, 11th, in 2014.

Career 
Elizabeth debuted on the junior international level with Romain Le Gac in the 2010–11 season. In January 2012, they represented France at the Winter Youth Olympics in Innsbruck, Austria, placing 6th in the short dance, 5th in the free dance, and 5th overall. They won bronze in the team event.

Elizabeth/Le Gac finished 15th at the 2013 World Junior Championships in Milan after ranking 13th in the short and 18th in the free dance. They placed 11th in both segments and 11th overall at the 2014 World Junior Championships in Sofia, Bulgaria. They were coached by Muriel Boucher-Zazoui, Romain Haguenauer, and Olivier Schoenfelder in Lyon. Their partnership ended by July 2014.

Programs 
(with Le Gac)

Competitive highlights 
JGP: Junior Grand Prix

(with Le Gac)

References

External links 

 

1996 births
French female ice dancers
Living people
People from Châlons-en-Champagne
Figure skaters at the 2012 Winter Youth Olympics
Sportspeople from Marne (department)
21st-century French women